{{Speciesbox
| image = 
| taxon = Scolecenchelys laticaudata
| authority = (Ogilby, 1897)
| synonyms_ref = 
| synonyms = 
 Myropterura laticaudata Ogilby, 1897
 Muraenichthys laticaudata (Ogilby, 1897)
 Muraenichthys laticaudatus (Ogilby, 1897)
}}
The redfin worm-eel (Scolecenchelys laticaudata, also known as the pearlbelly snake-eel) is an eel in the family Ophichthidae (worm/snake eels). It was described by James Douglas Ogilby in 1897, originally under the genus Myropterura''. It is a marine, tropical eel which is known from the Indo-Pacific and southeastern Atlantic Ocean, including the Red Sea, East and South Africa, Ducie Island, and Lord Howe Island.

References

Fish described in 1897
Scolecenchelys